Molly M. Mayeux is an American producer. She got her start as a production runner on the film Everybody's All-American in 1988. As of 2012, she is credited in the production of more than 40 films. She is the founder and president of Dahlia Street Films.

Filmography

Producer
Buddy Holly Is Alive and Well on Ganymede (producer)
Blind Turn (producer)
Deadline (producer)
I Will Follow (producer)
Open Gate (producer)
Homeland (line producer)
Soccer Mom (line producer)
The Loss of a Teardrop Diamond (line producer)
Rain (producer)
The Strand (co-producer)Two Weeks (line producer)Wasted (line producer)Open Window (line producer)The Hand Job (producer)Dandelion (producer)Easy (co-producer)Rustin (2001 film) (producer)Dancing in September (line producer)The Hi-Line (producer)Savior (associate producer)I Shot a Man in Vegas (producer)

Second Unit Director or Assistant DirectorAn American Town (TV movie) (second assistant director)Gun Shy (second assistant director)Entropy (assistant director: Los Angeles)A Thousand Acres (second assistant director)
The Locusts (second assistant director)
Kingpin (second assistant director)
Almost Blue (first assistant director)
Batman Forever (second second assistant director)
Dumb & Dumber (second assistant director)
The Road to Wellville (second assistant director)
The Puppet Masters (second assistant director: second unit)
Getting Even with Dad (second second assistant director)
Matinee (second second assistant director)
Leather Jackets (second assistant director)
Driving Me Crazy (second assistant director)
Best of the Best (second second assistant director)

Miscellaneous Crew

Ghost in the Machine (production assistant: second unit)
Hook (production assistant)
Shout (production assistant)
Joe Versus the Volcano (production aide)
Scenes from the Class Struggle in Beverly Hills (assistant craft service)
Everybody's All-American (production runner)

Production Manager
 Diary of a Mad Black Woman (unit production manager)
 Easy (unit production manager)
 Rustin (unit production manager)

References

Year of birth missing (living people)
Living people
American film producers